The 1932–33 Eintracht Frankfurt season was the 33rd season in the club's football history. 

In 1932–33 the club played in the Bezirksliga Main-Hessen (Main division), the top tier of German football. It was the club's 7th season in the Bezirksliga Main-Hessen (Main division). 

The season ended up with Eintracht finishing as runners-up in the Bezirksliga Main-Hessen (Main division). In the South German Championship round finished as runners-up. In the semi-finals of the German Championship knockout stage lost to Fortuna Düsseldorf.

Matches

Legend

Friendlies

Bezirksliga Main-Hessen (Main division)

League fixtures and results

League table

Results summary

Results by round

South German championship round

League fixtures and results

League table

Results summary

Results by round

Qualification for the German Championship knockout stage

German Championship knockout stage

Squad

Squad and statistics

|}

Transfers

In:

Out:

Notes

See also
 1933 German football championship

Sources

External links
 Official English Eintracht website 
 German archive site 

1932-33
German football clubs 1932–33 season